Lion Sands Private Game Reserve, also known as Lion Sands Reserve, was established in 1933 by Guy Aubrey Chalkley, and forms part of the Sabi Sands Private Game Reserve as well as the Kruger National Park, which together with some other parks make up the Greater Kruger National Park in South Africa.

Wildlife
The wildlife in the park includes the Big Five. The preserved plains of the Sabi Sands and the Kruger National Park hold one of highest concentrations of game per hectare on the planet. This, coupled with ethical and responsible conservation management, have resulted in animals which are highly habituated to human presence. Our landrovers pose no threat, and we able to get really close to countless animal species (including predators, general game, reptiles, insects, and birds-a-plenty).

History 
Guy Aubrey Chalkley, affectionately known as Chalk, was a keen hunter and traveled extensively throughout Africa. It was on one such adventure that he stumbled across Kingstown. Belonging to the Transvaal Consolidated Lands, this was a jewel of a property on the border of the Kruger National Park. These were the same lands that were soon to become the basis of what is now the world-famous Sabi Sand Wildtuin (Game Reserve).

Guy was filled with affection for the animals around him and with admiration for the pristine condition of the Kingstown property. It’s a known fact that he never lifted a rifle to an animal in this reserve. Guy purchased the property on 25 November 1933 from Transvaal Consolidated Mines for four thousand pounds and fourteen shillings.

John More, who married Guy’s granddaughter, Louise Chalkley, introduced Kingstown to the public in 1978 when he built two camps: River Lodge and Bush Lodge. Even during those early days of extremely basic bush operations (hot water was a luxury), the More family concentrated on keeping Kingstown in its pristine state.

Today, the family employs a full-time ecologist (the only reserve in the Sabi Sand Wildtuin to do so) to monitor the effect of commercialization on the wilderness.

Accommodation
The game reserve has 4 game lodges:
 Ivory Lodge, An utterly exclusive & intimate luxury Lodge with 6 private Villas (each with plunge pool, deck and lounge area) along the banks of the Sabie River within the Sabi Sand Reserve
 Tinga Lodge, A bold & sophisticated luxury Lodge, with 9 private Suites (each with plunge pool, lounge and deck) along the Sabie River in the Kruger National Park.
 Narina Lodge, A bold & sophisticated luxury Lodge, with 9 private Suites (each with plunge pool, lounge and deck) along the Sabie River in the Kruger National Park. Children over 6 welcome.
 River Lodge, 20 deluxe Suites enjoy bush or Sabie River views

See also
 Sabi Sand Private Game Reserve
 Kruger National Park

References

Lion Sands Game Reserve | Map | Accommodation | Activities | Wildlife

- Lion Sands River Lodge

- Lion Sands Narina Lodge

- Lion Sands Ivory Lodge

- Lion Sands Tinga Lodge

- Lion Sands Chalkley Treehouse

- Lion Sands Kingston Treehouse

- Lion Sands Tinyeleti Treehouse

https://www.sabi-sands.com/lion-sands-game-reserve.html Lion Sands Game Reserve

http://www.lionsands.com/ http://www.lionsands.com/about/location.php

http://www.lionsands.com/more/story/

About Ivory Lodge: https://web.archive.org/web/20150511062429/http://www.lionsands.com/our-lodges/ivory-lodge-sabi-sand/

About Tinga Lodge: http://www.lionsands.com/our-lodges/tinga-luxury-lodge-kruger-national-park/

About Narina Lodge: http://www.lionsands.com/our-lodges/narina-lodge-kruger-national-park/

About River Lodge: http://www.lionsands.com/our-lodges/narina-lodge-kruger-national-park/

Wildlife at Lion Sands: http://www.lionsands.com/on-safari/the-wildlife/

Protected areas of Mpumalanga